The Tomb of Chen Jhong-he is a tomb of a prominent businessman Chen Jhong-he in Lingya District, Kaohsiung, Taiwan.

History
Chen Jhong-he was a rose to prominence during the end of Qing Dynasty and early Japanese rule of Taiwan which made him one of the most important entrepreneur and wealthy businessman. He died in 1916, and the construction of his tomb started in 1930. After five years of construction work, the tomb was completed in 1935.

Architecture
The tomb covers an area of 2.235 hectares adopting a Fujian style of tomb construction and combines both Japanese and Western Baroque architecture style from the Japanese rule period.

Transportation
The tomb is accessible from south of Wukuaicuo Station of Kaohsiung MRT.

See also
 Chen Jhong-he Memorial Hall

References

1935 establishments in Taiwan
Baroque architecture in Kaohsiung
Buildings and structures in Kaohsiung
Cemeteries in Taiwan
Lingya District